Dyschirius ussuriensis is a species of ground beetle in the subfamily Scaritinae. It was described by Fedorenko in 1991.

References

ussuriensis
Beetles described in 1991